Galveston County Rangers Football Club was an American soccer team based in Galveston County, Texas. Originally named Galveston Pirate Soccer Club, they were renamed Galveston County Rangers FC in March 2015, Galveston Pirate SC was founded in 1916, the team played until the 1940s, then reemerged in the 1960s and 1970s for a period of about seven years each time.

In 2010 the team was again reborn and played in the fourth-tier National Premier Soccer League as an expansion team in 2011-12, a season they finished as the champions of the South Central Conference.  On March 11, 2014 Texas Premier Soccer League owner and president, Brendan Keyes announced that William Alsobrook had been named sole owner of the franchise.

The team has failed to join a league since re-branding under the Rangers name, and with no website updates or press announcements the team is presumed inactive or folded.

The team's home field is Texas Avenue Baptist Church, owned by Texas Avenue Baptist Church in League City Texas. The team's colors are Royal Blue, White and Red.

History
Rangers FC, as Pirate SC, has a long history in the Galveston area going back to the original soccer team of 1916. The team came back in the 1960s and 70s, but lost momentum.

Rangers FC joins TBA
Galveston Rangers are founding members of a statewide semiprofessional men's league that will be announced shortly.

Rangers announce start of Women's Team
In February 2015 Galveston Rangers Football Club announced they would be fielding three women's teams.  The sides include a first team which will be a feeder club for the Houston Aces, a reserve team, and a developmental team.

Rangers announce start of Youth Academy
In February 2015 Galveston County Rangers Football Club announced they would be launching a youth academy system.  The Academy will feature U5-U19 Boys Girls and Coed sides for all levels of play.

Rangers FC Official Affiliations
Galveston Rangers FC have announced official affiliation partnerships with: 
Glasgow Rangers Football Club Glasgow, Scotland, United Kingdom
Empoli Football Club, Perugia, Italy, 
Alloway FC, Bundaberg, Queensland, Australia; 
Monmouth Town AFC, Monmouth Town, Wales, United Kingdom;  
Walsall Football Club, Walsall, England, United Kingdom; 
The West Indies Football Association, St. Joseph Trinidad; 
Walsall Football Club (Sierra Leone);
Atlentico Stars FC and Atlentico Stars Youth Soccer Academy (ASYSA) in Kisumu, Nyalenda Kenya, Houston Aces, Houston, Texas, United States.
SC Juelich 1910, Juelich, Germany

Notable Matches
As Pirate SC notable matches include Monterrey Rayados, Houston Dynamo, San Antonio Scorpions.

Crest & Jersey

The colors of Ranger's crest are royal blue, red and white. The Star with the inscription GPSC 1916 is a nod to the club's origins from Galveston Pirate Soccer Club first formed in 1916.

Home Uniform Sponsor

Galveston Rangers FC have not announced a shirt sponsor for 2015/16 Season

Away Uniform Sponsor

Galveston Rangers FC have not announced an Away Shirt Sponsor for 2015/16 Season
Pirate Soccer Club were sponsored by Miller Lite in 2014/15

Stadium

Current Stadium

Texas Avenue Baptist Church, owned by Texas Avenue Baptist Church; League City Galveston County, Texas Texas (2015–Present).

The club will play their upcoming (League TBA) matches at Texas Avenue Baptist Church, TBD, Galveston County TX.

Rangers will play home games here over the course of the 2015-2016 season and beyond.

Previous Stadiums
 Kermit Courville Stadium; Galveston, Texas (2010–2011)
 Weis Middle School Stadium; Galveston, Texas (2012)
 Dow Park; Deer Park, Texas (2013/14)
 International Soccer Development Center; Alvin, Texas (2014-2015)

Team
Owner:  William Alsobrook
Equity Partners:

Senior Club Staff
Chief Executive Officer:  William Alsobrook
Chief Human Resources Officer:   Bethany Alsobrook
Chief Financial Officer:  Bethany Alsobrook
Chief Operating Officer:  Ernie Alsobrook
Senior Vice President:  Linda Alsobrook
Executive Vice President for Soccer Operations:  James Baird
Executive Vice President of Marketing:   Tyler Cambell
Executive Vice President:  Lonnie King
General Manager:  Creighton Brooks
Assistant General Manager:  Randy Wooster
Director of Coaching:   Bijan Timjani
Youth Academy Director:  Brandon Adler
Youth Academy Director of Coaching:   Daniel Parejo

Coaching Staff 
Head coach:  Douglas Mann
Assistant Coach:   Bijan Timjani
Assistant Coach:  William Alsobrook
Assistant Coach:  Irvelli Morris
Goalkeepers Coach:  John Sime
Goalkeepers Coach:  James Baird
Goalkeepers Coach:  Jacques Leglib
Athletic Trainer: Bridget Brooks
Assistant Athletic Trainer: TBD
Manager, PR/Media: Douglas Mann
Equipment Manager: 
Team Physician:
Team Nurse: 
Dance Team Coordinator:

1st Team Squad 

(*On Loan to Toronto Lynx for 2015 USL PDL Season)
(**** On loan to Atletico Juniors FC for trial)
c Captain

References

External links
Galveston Rangers FC Official Site
Galveston Pirate SC Official Site
Galveston Rangers Official Facebook Site

Association football clubs established in 2015
Soccer clubs in Texas
Sports in Galveston, Texas
Soccer clubs in Houston
2015 establishments in Texas